The Labors of Sisyphus may refer to

The Greek myth of Sisyphus
The 1897 novel by Stefan Żeromski Syzyfowe prace.